is a monorail station on the Chiba Urban Monorail in Chūō-ku in the city of Chiba, Chiba Prefecture, Japan. It is the terminus for Line 1 of the Chiba Urban Monorail and is located 3.2 kilometers from the opposite terminus at Chiba Station.

Lines
 Chiba Urban Monorail Line 1

Station layout
Kenchō-mae Station is an elevated station with two opposed side platforms serving two tracks; however, only Platform 1 is normally used.

Platforms

History
Kenchō-mae Station opened on March 24, 1999.

See also
 List of railway stations in Japan

References

External links

Chiba Urban Monorail website 

Railway stations in Japan opened in 1999
Railway stations in Chiba Prefecture